70th Birthday Concert is a live album by American pianist, composer and bandleader Duke Ellington recorded in  England recorded at the Free Trade Hall in Manchester, England and originally released on the Solid State label in 1970. The album was later reissued on CD on the Blue Note label in 1995.

Reception
The Allmusic review by Scott Yanow stated:

Track listing

Recorded at Colston Hall in Bristol, England on November 25 (track 10) and Free Trade Hall in Manchester, England on November 26 (tracks 1-9 & 10-17), 1969.

Personnel
Duke Ellington – piano
Cat Anderson, Mercer Ellington, Rolf Ericson, Cootie Williams – trumpet
Lawrence Brown – trombone
Chuck Connors – bass trombone
Russell Procope – alto saxophone, clarinet 
Johnny Hodges – alto saxophone
Norris Turney – clarinet, alto saxophone, tenor saxophone, flute
Harold Ashby – tenor saxophone, flute
Paul Gonsalves – tenor saxophone
Harry Carney – clarinet, bass clarinet, baritone saxophone
Wild Bill Davis – organ 
Victor Gaskin – bass
Rufus Jones – drums

References

1969 live albums
Duke Ellington live albums
Live orchestral jazz albums
Solid State Records (jazz label) live albums